This is a list of diplomatic missions of the Federated States of Micronesia. The Federated States of Micronesia became independent from the United States in 1986.
The FSM maintains permanent embassies in four Asia-Pacific nations: China, Fiji, Japan and the United States. The FSM also maintains three resident consulates in Honolulu, HI, Portland, Oregon and Tamuning, GU. The FSM maintains non-resident embassies for four nations: Indonesia, Malaysia and Singapore (all in Japan) and Israel in Fiji.

America

 Washington, D.C. (Embassy)
 Honolulu (Consulate-General)
 Portland (Consulate-General)
 Tamuning (Consulate-General)

Asia

 Beijing (Embassy)

 Tokyo (Embassy)

Oceania

 Suva (Embassy)

Multilateral organisations
 
 New York City (Mission)

Gallery

See also
 Foreign relations of the Federated States of Micronesia
 List of diplomatic missions in the Federated States of Micronesia

References

Federated States of Micronesia

Federated States of Micronesia diplomacy-related lists